Konstantin Valeryevich Morozov (born 13 May 1992) is a Russian professional football player. He plays for Amkar Perm.

Club career
He made his Russian Football National League debut for FC Torpedo Armavir on 12 July 2015 in a game against FC Zenit-2 Saint Petersburg.

References

External links
 
 

1992 births
People from Vyshny Volochyok
Living people
Russian footballers
Association football defenders
Russian expatriate footballers
Expatriate footballers in Armenia
Ulisses FC players
Armenian Premier League players
FC Armavir players
FC Yenisey Krasnoyarsk players
FC Rubin Kazan players
FC Ararat Moscow players
FC Ararat Yerevan players
FC Krymteplytsia Molodizhne players
Crimean Premier League players
FC Amkar Perm players
FC Akron Tolyatti players
FC Khimki players
FC Veles Moscow players
Sportspeople from Tver Oblast